Justin Taylor James (born January 24, 1997) is an American professional basketball player for the Cleveland Charge of the NBA G League. He played college basketball for the Wyoming Cowboys.  He was selected by the Sacramento Kings in the second round of the 2019 NBA draft.

College career
A native of Port St. Lucie, Florida, James was an unheralded basketball recruit out of high school, generating only one high-major offer from Mississippi State, before ultimately going to the University of Wyoming. He became a full-time contributor by his sophomore year and increased his scoring average each year. James led the Mountain West Conference in scoring during his final season at Wyoming, averaging 22.1 points per game as a senior, despite playing as a point guard, a position he does not normally play, because Wyoming needed James to have the ball as much as possible during an 8–24 season. He also led the Cowboys with 8.5 rebounds and 4.4 assists per game, and made second team All-Mountain West. James had a three-point field goal percentage of 33.7 percent during his college career. Despite his high scoring, James posted career-lows in field goal percentage (40.9 percent) and 3-point field goal percentage (29.6 percent) during his senior high, as well as 4.1 turnovers per game.

James finished his college career with 2,061 points, the third-highest in Mountain West history. He also participated in the Portsmouth Invitational Tournament, one of 64 seniors from around the country invited to the event.

Professional career

Sacramento Kings (2019–2021)
James was selected by the Sacramento Kings in the second round of the 2019 NBA draft with the 40th overall pick, and became the first University of Wyoming player drafted since the Los Angeles Lakers selected Larry Nance Jr. in 2015. CBS Sports had ranked James as the 96th-best prospect heading into the draft, while the Sporting News and NBADraft.net had him unranked, and most mock drafts did not predict he would be picked. Sacramento General Manager Vlade Divac said the team drafted him because they followed his college career and appreciated his passion and production: "We talked to everybody about his professionalism and his love for the game. We were so excited when we spent time with him in Sacramento." On July 10, 2019, the Sacramento Kings announced that they had signed James. On October 25, 2019, James made his debut in the NBA, coming off the bench in a 112–122 loss to the Portland Trail Blazers with two points. He scored 30 points for the G League Stockton Kings in a win over the Iowa Wolves on January 11, 2020.

Cleveland Charge (2021–2022)
On September 22, 2021, James signed a two-way contract with the Utah Jazz. However, he was waived on October 1. On October 13, he signed with Cleveland Cavaliers, but was waived three days later. On October 23, he signed with the Cleveland Charge as an affiliate player. James averaged 17.8 points, 4.8 rebounds, and 2.7 assists per game.

On December 26, 2021, the New Orleans Pelicans signed James to a 10-day contract. However, he never appeared in a game for the team.

On January 5, 2022, James was reacquired by the Cleveland Charge.

James joined the Orlando Magic for the 2022 NBA Summer League.

Metropolitans 92 (2022–2023) 
On December 13, 2022, James signed with Metropolitans 92 of the LNB Pro A.

Return to the Charge (2023–present) 
On March 2, 2023, James was re-acquired by the Cleveland Charge.

Career statistics

NBA regular season

|-
| style="text-align:left;"| 
| style="text-align:left;"| Sacramento
| 36 || 0 || 6.4 || .417 || .310 || .476 || .9 || .5 || .2 || .3 || 2.5
|-
| style="text-align:left;"| 
| style="text-align:left;"| Sacramento
| 36 || 0 || 8.6 || .468 || .368 || .583 || .8 || .6 || .2 || .1 || 3.9
|- class="sortbottom"
| style="text-align:center;" colspan="2"|Career
| 72 || 0 || 7.5 || .446 || .343 || .544 || .9 || .6 || .2 || .2 || 3.2

College

|-
| style="text-align:left;"| 2015–16
| style="text-align:left;"| Wyoming
| 31 || 3 || 16.6 || .418 || .358 || .565 || 2.1 || .8 || .3 || .4 || 5.1
|-
| style="text-align:left;"| 2016–17
| style="text-align:left;"| Wyoming
| 37 || 6 || 26.2 || .462 || .419 || .762 || 5.0 || 2.2 || .8 || .5 || 16.0
|-
| style="text-align:left;"| 2017–18
| style="text-align:left;"| Wyoming
| 32 || 32 || 31.2 || .472 || .308 || .726 || 6.0 || 3.1 || 1.1 || .5 || 18.9
|-
| style="text-align:left;"| 2018–19
| style="text-align:left;"| Wyoming
| 32 || 32 || 38.2 || .409 || .296 || .741 || 8.5 || 4.4 || 1.5 || .6 || 22.1
|- class="sortbottom"
| style="text-align:center;" colspan="2"| Career
| 132 || 73 || 28.1 || .442 || .337 || .731 || 5.4 || 2.6 || .9 || .5 || 15.6

References

External links
Wyoming Cowboys bio

1997 births
Living people
American men's basketball players
Basketball players from Florida
Cleveland Charge players
Metropolitans 92 players
People from Port St. Lucie, Florida
Sacramento Kings draft picks
Sacramento Kings players
Shooting guards
Small forwards
Stockton Kings players
St. Lucie West Centennial High School alumni
Wyoming Cowboys basketball players